Llangwyfan may refer to:
 Llangwyfan, Anglesey, Wales
 Llangwyfan, Denbighshire, Wales